Ozark Township is one of twenty-five townships in Barry County, Missouri, United States. As of the 2000 census, its population was 879.

Ozark Township was organized in 1840, taking its name from the Ozark Mountains.

Geography

The stream of West Fork Jenkins Creek runs through this township.

References

 USGS Geographic Names Information System (GNIS)

External links
 US-Counties.com
 City-Data.com

Townships in Barry County, Missouri
Townships in Missouri